Harold Marion Barrow (August 8, 1909 – May 15, 2005) was the sixth head football coach for the Eureka College Red Devils located in Eureka, Illinois and he held that position for three seasons, from 1946 until 1948.  His career coaching record at Eureka was 8 wins, 10 losses, and 2 ties. This ranks him 11th at Eureka in total wins and sixth at Eureka in winning percentage. He later coached at Evansville College in Evansville, Illinois.

References

External links
 

1909 births
2005 deaths
Eureka Red Devils football coaches
Eureka Red Devils men's basketball coaches
College men's basketball head coaches in the United States
People from Callaway County, Missouri